Richard Alan Berg (born August 16, 1959) is an American businessman and politician who served as the U.S. representative for  from 2011 to 2013. Berg served on the House Ways and Means Committee. He is a member of the Republican Party. Before his election to Congress in 2010, he served in the state North Dakota House of Representatives, with stints as majority leader and speaker. On May 16, 2011, Berg announced his run for the United States Senate seat being vacated by Democratic incumbent Kent Conrad but lost narrowly to Heidi Heitkamp on November 6, 2012.

Early life and education
Berg was born in Maddock and raised on a farm in Hettinger. His father was a large animal veterinarian and his mother was a writer. His grandfather immigrated to the United States from Norway.

Berg graduated from Hettinger High School. He earned a wrestling scholarship to the North Dakota State College of Science. He attended for a year before transferring to North Dakota State University, where he graduated with a Bachelor of Arts degree in agricultural economics.

Early career 
In 1982, after college he co-founded Midwest Management Company (which became Goldmark Property Management in 1994), a real-estate management firm in Fargo. In 1987 he moved on to an affiliate commercial real estate company spun off from Midwest. In 1996 along with other early partners in Midwest he founded Goldmark Commercial Corporation which has since been renamed to Goldmark Schlossman Commercial Real Estate.

North Dakota House of Representatives

Elections
Berg first ran for the North Dakota House of Representatives in 1984 in the 10th House District, based in Fargo. He won and was re-elected every four years after, until his congressional run in 2010.

In 2002, after redistricting he decided to run in the newly redrawn 45th House District, and won a seat with 31%. In 2006, he won re-election with 28%.

Tenure
In 1991, he became the chair of the House Republican caucus. In 1993, he briefly served as speaker of the House. In 2003, he became the House majority leader.

As speaker, he proposed a controversial new education funding system aimed at making payments more equitable.

Berg supported President George W. Bush's plan to partially privatize Social Security through private accounts in 2005.

In 2007, Berg voted on ND House Bill 1489, which proposed making abortion a class AA felony, even in the case of rape and incest.

In 2009, he earned the Petroleum Council's Legislator of the Year and the North Dakota Chamber of Commerce's Greater North Dakotan award.

U.S. House of Representatives

Election

On January 20, 2010, Berg officially announced he was seeking the GOP endorsement to run for the United States House of Representatives. In March 2010, Berg won the GOP nomination at the Republican state convention to challenge incumbent Democratic Representative Earl Pomeroy for the state's at-large seat in the United States House of Representatives. In the general election Berg defeated the incumbent with 55% of the vote to represent . At the time of his election, Berg was the 13th wealthiest member of Congress.

The biggest donor to Berg's campaign was Goldmark Property Management, Inc. As of 2011, Berg worked at Goldmark since 1981 and was promoted to Senior Vice President of Goldmark Schlossman Commercial Real Estate Services in 2005.

Tenure
Berg voted for the Paul Ryan budget, which would restructure Medicare and Medicaid.

Berg strongly supports a balanced-budget amendment to the Constitution.

He voted in favor of the National Right-to-Carry Reciprocity Act and has received "A" and "A+" ratings from the National Rifle Association Political Victory Fund for his stance on gun rights.

Berg joined almost 60 other members of Congress in a letter to the Joint Select Committee on Deficit Reduction that urged committee members not to cut the critical access hospital (CAH) program. The CAH program provides assistance to rural hospitals. 36 CAHs exist in North Dakota, including one in Hettinger, Berg's hometown.

Berg has voted to curtail  EPA regulations, stating: "In North Dakota, we know the damaging effects that overreaching government regulations can have on our small businesses and their ability to create jobs." He has also proposed drilling for oil in federal lands, including North Dakota's own Theodore Roosevelt National Park, as a way to provide funding for Social Security. In 2009, he was presented with the Greater North Dakotan Award by the North Dakota Chamber of Commerce for his support of business interests.

Berg is anti-abortion and has voted to prohibit federal funds from being used for health care plans that cover abortions. He is a member of the Congressional Prayer Caucus.

Berg is against same-sex marriage.

Committee assignments

Berg was a member of the U.S. House Ways & Means Committee.

Caucus Memberships
 Congressional Western Caucus
 Unmanned Systems Caucus
 General Aviation Caucus
 Coal Caucus
 Friends of Norway Caucus
 Job Creators Caucus
 E-911 Caucus
 National Archives Caucus
 Rural Health Care Coalition
 Sportsman Caucus
 Sugar Caucus
 Congressional Prayer Caucus
 House National Guard and Reserve Caucus

2012 U.S. Senate election

On May 16, 2011, Berg announced he would run for the United States Senate seat being vacated by Democratic incumbent Kent Conrad.

Election night results indicated that Berg had lost to former state Attorney General Heidi Heitkamp by 2,936 votes.  As the difference was less than 1% of the ballots cast, Berg declined to concede immediately.  The next day, however, Berg acknowledged his Democratic opponent's victory.

References

External links

 Financial information at OpenSecrets.org (U.S. Senate)
 Financial information at OpenSecrets.org (U.S. House)
 Campaign finance reports and data at the Federal Election Commission (U.S. Senate)
 Campaign finance reports and data at the Federal Election Commission (U.S. House)
 

|-

|-

|-

|-

1959 births
20th-century American politicians
21st-century American politicians
American people of Norwegian descent
Businesspeople from North Dakota
Living people
Republican Party members of the North Dakota House of Representatives
State political party chairs of North Dakota
North Dakota State University alumni
People from Adams County, North Dakota
People from Benson County, North Dakota
Republican Party members of the United States House of Representatives from North Dakota
Speakers of the North Dakota House of Representatives